The Billy Ball House, located at 209 Richmond St. in Lancaster, Kentucky, was a historic house built in 1830.  Also known as Edna Reynold's House, it was listed on the National Register of Historic Places in 1984.

It was built during the 1830s.  It is or was a two-story three-bay frame building on a limestone foundation, with a  log structure underneath its siding.  In 1983, it was one of only seven log structures surviving in Lancaster, and it was vacant.

The house seems no longer to exist.

References

Houses on the National Register of Historic Places in Kentucky
Houses completed in 1835
Houses in Garrard County, Kentucky
Lancaster, Kentucky
Former buildings and structures in Kentucky
National Register of Historic Places in Garrard County, Kentucky
1835 establishments in Kentucky
Log buildings and structures on the National Register of Historic Places in Kentucky
Log houses in the United States
Demolished but still listed on the National Register of Historic Places